Kimberly Birrell (born 29 April 1998) is an Australian tennis player.
Birrell reached a career-high WTA ranking of world No. 115 on 6 March 2023. She has won four singles titles and one doubles title on the ITF Circuit.

Personal life
Birrell was born in Düsseldorf, Germany, on 29 April 1998 to Australian parents. Her father, John, was working as a tennis coach in Germany at the time of her birth and shortly after relocated his family to Wodonga, Victoria. The family then settled on the Gold Coast, Queensland when Birrell was three years of age as her father took up a role as the head coach of Pat Cash's Tennis Academy. She began playing tennis at the age of four and switched training bases to the Queens Park Tennis Centre in 2008 when her father began managing the club. Queens Park had previously produced top 20 tennis players such as Bernard Tomic and Samantha Stosur, the latter of whom would train with Birrell when visiting the club. Birrell attended Coomera Anglican College during her schooling years and graduated in 2015.

Junior career
Birrell began playing on the ITF Junior Circuit under-18 events in July 2011 as a 13-year-old. She reached her first junior final a year later in Sydney and came out victorious over Pamela Boyanov in three sets. Following a strong 2012 season, she made her junior Grand Slam debut at the 2013 Australian Open at 14 years of age and was beaten by Sweden's Rebecca Peterson in straight sets. She continued to improve her junior ranking throughout 2013 by reaching two finals.

She entered the 2014 Australian Open unseeded and caused several upsets on her way to the semifinals. In the semifinals, she was defeated by Croatian player Jana Fett. She went on to compete in all the remaining majors throughout 2014 and reached her highest junior ranking of 18 in the world. Birrell competed in three junior Grand Slam events in 2015 but mostly focused on the women's tour.

Professional career
Birrell competed in her first professional event at the Bendigo Tennis Centre in October 2012 at the age of 14. She gained her first professional ranking point a year later with a straight sets win over Elizabeth James after receiving a wildcard into the main draw of a tournament held in her home state of Queensland. She finished 2013 with a professional singles ranking of 847.

2014: WTA tour doubles debut
Birrell was awarded a wildcard into the doubles main draw of the Hobart International with compatriot Olivia Tjandramulia, where they lost in the first round to second seeds Lisa Raymond and Zhang Shuai.

In November, Birrell was given wildcards to the two Bendigo International tournaments. In her debut at a $50k event, she defeated world No. 351, Veronika Kapshay, in straight sets.

2015: Grand Slam doubles debut
In 2015, Birrell was awarded a qualifying wildcard into the Hobart International, but lost to Vitalia Diatchenko in straight sets. She was then given a wildcard for the Australian Open qualifying, where she fell to Kateryna Bondarenko, in three sets. She also made her Grand Slam main-draw debut by getting one of seven team wildcards in women's doubles alongside Priscilla Hon, but lost to the fifth seeds, Raquel Kops-Jones and Abigail Spears.

In March, Birrell qualified for and made the first ITF Circuit final of her career in Mildura, but lost to compatriot Alison Bai, 3–6, 3–6. Birrell didn't play between April–September, but returned to Australia to play in Tweed Heads, Cairns, Toowoomba, Brisbane and Canberra. Her best results were a final in Brisbane and a semifinal in Canberra. 

She finished the year with a ranking of No. 361.

2016: Major & WTA Tour singles debut & first final in doubles
Birrell was awarded a wildcard into the qualifying rounds of the Brisbane International, but lost to eventual main draw semifinalist Samantha Crawford. 

Birrell made her WTA Tour debut after being awarded a wildcard into the main draw at the Hobart International. She won 6–4, 6–3 against world No. 57, Danka Kovinić from Montenegro. She lost in round two to Dominika Cibulková. In the same tournament, she partnered Jarmila Wolfe in the doubles where they made the final. 

Birrell was awarded a wildcard into the Australian Open but she lost in round one to ninth seed Karolína Plíšková, 4–6, 4–6.
In February, Birrell made her Fed Cup debut against Dominika Cibulková, she lost 3–6, 1–6. Shortly after, she suffered a right elbow injury, sidelining her for the rest of the year. 

Birrell ended 2016 with a ranking of No. 584.

2017: First ITF singles title 
Birrell and her doubles partner, Priscilla Hon, were given a wildcard into the Australian Open, losing in the first round to Sam Stosur and Zhang Shuai. Six months later, Birrell and doubles partner Caroline Dolehide made the final of the ITF tournament in Winnipeg, Canada, losing to Hiroko Kuwata and Valeria Savinykh in two sets (a win would have marked Birrell's best win at an ITF tournament to date). The next week, in Gatineau, Birrell and her new doubles partner, Emily Webley-Smith of Great Britain, lost in the final to the same duo - Kuwata and Savinykh - in a third-set tiebreak. Birrell came back at the end of September with a run to the final in the Penrith International, losing to Olivia Rogowska in two sets. The following week in Brisbane, Birrell won her first ITF singles title by beating American Asia Muhammad in a tight three-setter.

2018: Top 300 debut
Birrell lost in the first round of qualifying in Brisbane, Sydney and the Melbourne. In August, she qualified for and reached her first quarterfinal of the year at the Landisville Challenge. In September, Kimberly reached the quarterfinals of the Cairns Tennis International before winning her second career ITF singles title in Darwin, where she also reached the final of the doubles. In December 2018, she won the Australian Open Wildcard Playoffs.

She ended 2018 with a singles ranking of No. 285.

2019–20: Australian Open third round, first top-ten win and elbow injury
Birrell commenced 2019 with a wildcard into the Brisbane International, where she claimed her first top 10 win over Daria Kasatkina.

At the 2019 Australian Open, Birrell had defeated Paula Badosa in round one, earning her first Grand Slam main-draw win before upsetting the 29th seed Donna Vekić, in the second round. She lost her third-round match against three time major champion and second seed Angelique Kerber, in straight sets.

In February, Birrell reached the second round of the Launceston International, before returning to the Australian Fed Cup team. She played Madison Keys in the first round of the 2019 Fed Cup World Group and lost the match, but Australia won the tie.
In April, she reached the quarterfinal of the Hardee's Pro Classic in Alabama.
                                                       
Birrell lost in the first round of qualifying in the 2019 French Open and Wimbledon. Wimbledon was Birrell's last competitive match for over a year due to an elbow injury.

2021: Loss of form and hiatus
Birrell played her first competitive match in 18 months at the Yarra Valley Classic, where she lost in round one. She was given a wildcard into the Australian Open where she lost in round one to Rebecca Marino. In February 2021, she made the third round of the Phillip Island Trophy. It would be her final tournament for the year. 

Birrell ended the season with a singles ranking of No. 740.

2022: Comeback
In January 2022, she played her first match in eleven months, at the Melbourne Summer Set 1, where she defeated Martina Trevisan in the first round of qualifying before losing to Lesley Pattinama Kerkhove in the final qualifying round.

Birrell then made the third and final round of the 2022 Australian Open – Women's singles qualifying.

2023: First WTA singles quarterfinal & doubles final, top 125, WTA 1000 debut
At the Australian Open she received a wildcard into the main draw, after Venus Williams withdrawal, and defeated 31st seed Kaia Kanepi in a three set match lasting two hours and 32 minutes. It was her first Grand Slam main draw win in four years, the third top-30 career win and the fourth top-50 one.
She reached a new career high ranking of No. 136 on 13 February 2023, following her fourth ITF title.

At the Mérida Open, she reached her first quarterfinal as a qualifier but lost to Caty McNally. She reached a new career high ranking of No. 116 on 27 February 2023. At the Monterrey Open, she reached her second WTA Tour doubles final partnering local favorite Fernanda Contreras Gómez after receiving a wildcard.

She made her WTA 1000 debut in Indian Wells as a qualifier.

National representation

Fed Cup
Birrell made her debut for the Australia Fed Cup team in February 2016 against Slovakia at the age of 17. She was selected to compete against Dominika Cibulková in the fourth rubber of the tie and was defeated 6–3, 6–1.

Performance timelines
Only main-draw results in WTA Tour, Grand Slam tournaments, Fed Cup/Billie Jean King Cup and Olympic Games are included in win–loss records.

Singles
Current after the 2023 BNP Paribas Open.

Doubles

WTA career finals

Doubles: 2 (2 runner-ups)

ITF Circuit finals

Singles: 9 (4 titles, 5 runner–ups)

Doubles: 5 (1 title, 4 runner–ups)

Wins over top 10 players

Notes

References

External links

 
 
 
 

1998 births
Living people
Sportspeople from Düsseldorf
Australian female tennis players
Sportswomen from Queensland
Tennis people from the Gold Coast